Mal or MAL may refer to:

Places 
 Mal (community development block), in Jalpaiguri district of West Bengal, India
 Mal (Vidhan Sabha constituency), an assembly constituency in Jalpaiguri district of West Bengal, India
 Malbazar or Mal, a town in Jalpaiguri located in North Bengal, India
 Mal, Lucknow, a village in Lucknow district of Uttar Pradesh, India
 Mar-a-Lago, a resort in Palm Beach, Florida

Acronyms 
 MAL (gene), a human gene that encodes myelin and lymphocyte protein
 Maackia amurensis leukoagglutinin, lectin from the tree Maackia amurensis
 MAL Hungarian Aluminium, a Hungarian aluminum manufacturer
 Maritime Administration of Latvia, government agency of Latvia that oversees maritime affairs
 Median arcuate ligament, a ligament under the diaphragm on the posterior abdominal wall
 Message Abstraction Layer, a CCSDS Spacecraft Monitor and Control standard
 Methyl aminolevulinate, a photosensitizer used for photodynamic therapy for skin problems
 Mid-America League, a short-lived independent minor baseball league
 Military Authority Lira, another name of the Tripolitanian lira
 Model Arab League, an educational program that simulates the activities of the Arab League
 MonetDB Assembly Language, an assembly-like language used by the MonetDB database
 MyAnimeList, an anime and manga social networking and social cataloging application website

People 
 Mal people, an ethnic group of Southeast Asia
 Mal (caste), a Hindu group of India
 Mal Muslim, a Muslim group of India and Bangladesh
 Mal (name), a list of people with the given name or nickname
 Mal (died 946), prince of the Drevlians
 Mal Ryder (born 1944), stage name of British singer Paul Bradley Couling
 Suraj Mal (1707-1765), ruler of Bharatpur in Rajasthan, India
 Suraj Mal of Nurpur, Rajput ruler (1613–1618) of Nurpur, Himachal Pradesh in India
 Todar Mal (died 1589), finance minister of the Mughal Empire during the reign of Akbar the Great

Fictional characters 
 MAL (Captain Planet), Dr. Blight's evil supercomputer in the Captain Planet and the Planeteers series
 Mal Duncan, a DC comic book character
 Mal Reynolds, protagonist of the Firefly science-fiction franchise
 Mal (Descendants), Maleficent's daughter in the 2015 Disney film Descendants
 Mal, in the film Inception, played by Marion Cotillard
 Mal, Mike's evil alternate personality and the antagonist of Total Drama All-Stars
 Malori "Mal" Crowett, title character in the webtoon Mage & Demon Queen
 Mal Oretsev, character in the book series Shadow and Bone and its TV adaptation

Transport 
 Malden Manor railway station, London, National Rail station code MAL
 Malta (Amtrak station), a rail station in Montana, station code MAL
 Malaysia Airlines

Other uses 
 Mal (surfing), the longboard style of surfboard
 Mal language, a Mon–Khmer language of Laos and Thailand
 Alaskan Malamute dog, nickname
 Malaysia, UNDP and license plate country code
 Belgian Malinois dog, nickname
 Methallylescaline, a hallucinogenic drug
 Mal: Live 4 to 1, an album by Mal Waldron
 mal (unit), a Korean unit of volume
 mål, a Norwegian units of measurement of area
 Malayalam language, ISO 639-3 code

See also 
 MALS (disambiguation)